Bigpatch or Big Patch (formerly Kaysville) is an unincorporated community located in the town of Smelser, in Grant County, Wisconsin, United States. Welsh miners in the area named the community for a “patch” of lead ore nearby.

Notable people
George Cabanis, Wisconsin State Assembly
Arthur W. Kopp, United States House of Representatives

Notes

Unincorporated communities in Wisconsin
Unincorporated communities in Grant County, Wisconsin